A chinois is a conical sieve with an extremely fine mesh. It is used to strain custards, purees, soups, and sauces, producing a very smooth texture. It can also be used to dust food with a fine layer of powdered ingredient.

Etymology 
Chinois is a loanword from the French adjective meaning Chinese. French cooks call it this not because this kitchen tool comes from China, but because it resembles an Asian conical hat

Description 
A similarly-shaped utensil is the China cap, a reference to the Asian conical hats that used to be common in China. It is a perforated metal conical strainer with much larger holes than a chinois. A China cap is used to remove seeds and other coarse matter from soft foods, but produces a coarser-textured product than the chinois.

Both the chinois and the China cap often are used with a cone-shaped pestle. With the pestle tip placed in the bottom of the strainer, it is rolled against the sides of the device to work liquids and soft food through it. In this way, the chinois functions much like a tamis, and the China cap functions similar to a food mill. A small ladle can also be used instead of a pestle, allowing for scooping solids from the sides of the strainer as well as pressing liquid through the mesh.

See also 
 
 Colander
 Filter
 Sieve
 Tamis
 Zaru

References

External links 
 

Food preparation utensils
Bartending equipment